Ronayne Benjamin Marsh-Brown (born 13 November 1984) is a Guyanese footballer who plays as a left back for  side Biggleswade Town.

At the start of his career, playing under his former name of Ronayne Benjamin, he made three substitute appearances in Football League Two for Macclesfield Town in 2007. Since then he has played for numerous English non-league clubs.

International career
Marsh-Brown debuted for the Guyana national football team in a 2-2 CONCACAF Nations League tie with Barbados on 6 September 2018.

Personal life
Marsh-Brown's has 3 brothers, Kwai, Ky, and Keanu Marsh-Brown, who are all footballers. His younger brother Keanu is also a full international for Guyana, whilst Ky and Keanu received callups to represent the Antigua and Barbuda national football team.

References

External links
 
 
 Aylesbury United Profile
 FDB Profile

1984 births
Living people
Footballers from Chiswick
Citizens of Guyana through descent
Guyanese footballers
Guyana international footballers
English footballers
Guyanese people of Antigua and Barbuda descent
English people of Guyanese descent
Sportspeople of Guyanese descent
English sportspeople of Antigua and Barbuda descent
Association football fullbacks
Bedford Town F.C. players
Farnborough F.C. players
Lewes F.C. players
Metropolitan Police F.C. players
Aylesbury United F.C. players
Wingate & Finchley F.C. players
Harrow Borough F.C. players
Northwood F.C. players
Staines Town F.C. players
Bath City F.C. players
Dorchester Town F.C. players
Maidenhead United F.C. players
Macclesfield Town F.C. players
Ramsgate F.C. players
Crawley Town F.C. players
Folkestone Invicta F.C. players
Fisher Athletic F.C. players
Welling United F.C. players
Whitehawk F.C. players
East Thurrock United F.C. players
Peterborough Sports F.C. players
Marlow F.C. players
Biggleswade Town F.C. players
Isthmian League players
National League (English football) players
Northern Premier League players
Southern Football League players
2019 CONCACAF Gold Cup players